The Holy of Holies is a term in the Hebrew Bible that refers to the inner sanctuary of the Tabernacle.

Holy of Holies may also refer to:

Holy of Holies (LDS Church), a room in the Salt Lake Temple, Utah, US
Well of Souls, in Jerusalem, also called the Holy of Holies by medieval Christians

See also
Sanctum sanctorum